Nadine Jolie Courtney (née Haobsh; ; born August 23, 1980) is a Circassian American lifestyle writer, novelist, and former media personality. She is the author of the YA novel All-American Muslim Girl, Romancing the Throne, Beauty Confidential: The No Preaching, No Lies, Advice-You'll-Actually-Use-Guide to Looking Your Best, and Confessions of a Beauty Addict. Her blog "Jolie in NYC" received international press in 2005 after Courtney, a former beauty editor, was outed and dooced for anonymously blogging about the beauty industry. The New York Post subsequently dubbed her "the poster girl for the blogger generation".

In 2015, she appeared on season 2 of Bravo's reality documentary television series Newlyweds: The First Year alongside her husband, filmmaker Erik Courtney.

Early life
Courtney was born to a Muslim Jordanian father of Circassian and Syrian descent, and a Roman Catholic mother of Swiss-Austrian descent who later converted to Islam. Courtney was raised in her parents' Muslim faith, experiences she later parlayed into her novel All-American Muslim Girl.

Career
After graduating from Barnard College, Courtney worked at FHM, Lucky, and Ladies' Home Journal. In March 2005, she began blogging under the pseudonym Jolie in NYC, where she dispersed beauty advice and celebrity gossip. 

Her identity was revealed by the New York Post in July 2005, and when she was asked to leave Ladies' Home Journal while an offer at Seventeen magazine as Beauty Editor was simultaneously rescinded, her story received international coverage. Courtney appeared on Anderson Cooper, MSNBC, ABC, Fox and CNN and was profiled by the New York Times , People Magazine, The Guardian, Cosmopolitan magazine, Women's Wear Daily, Fashion Week Daily, and Time.

From 2005 to 2007, Courtney worked as a business consultant to 10-goal polo player Carlos Gracida and in 2006 was Creative Consultant to Sarah, Duchess of York.  She has written for Town & Country, Vanity Fair, Robb Report and Vogue (magazine).

Under her maiden name Haobsh, Courtney is the author of the bestselling beauty guide Beauty Confidential: The No Preaching, No Lies, Advice-You'll-Actually-Use-Guide to Looking Your Best;. Her first novel Confessions of a Beauty Addict was published in January 2009.

Her third book, a young adult novel called Romancing the Throne, was published in summer 2017. Courtney's fourth book, a young adult novel called All-American Muslim Girl, was published by FSG Books for Young Readers in fall 2019 and was named one of Kirkus Review's Best Young Adult Books of 2019.

Personal life 
Courtney lives in Santa Monica with her husband Erik Courtney, an independent information technology consultant and filmmaker. They have a daughter, Aurelia, whose birth was kept secret until the reality show's final episode.

On March 25, 2016, Courtney's brother Pierre Haobsh was arrested on suspicion of murdering a Chinese herbalist, his wife and 5-year-old daughter in Santa Barbara, California. Courtney released a statement on March 27, 2016, condemning the murders and extending prayers to the family.

Books
Beauty Confidential: The No Preaching, No Lies, Advice-You'll-Actually-Use-Guide to Looking Your Best.  Avon A (2007).  Paperback: , .
Confessions of a Beauty Addict.  Avon A (2009).  Paperback: , ASIN: B003A02X5M.
Romancing the Throne. Katherine Tegen Books (2017). Hardcover: 
All-American Muslim Girl. FSG Books for Young Readers (2019).

References

External links
Nadine Jolie Courtney website and blog
Bravo TV page
Amazon author page
HarperCollins author page
New York Post articles
New York Times articles

American women writers
Living people
American women bloggers
American bloggers
1980 births
Barnard College alumni
Participants in American reality television series
American people of Circassian descent
American Muslims
American people of Swiss descent
American people of Austrian descent
21st-century American women
American people of Syrian descent
American people of Jordanian descent